Patrick Hamilton may refer to:
Patrick Hamilton of Kincavil (died 1520), Scottish nobleman
Patrick Hamilton (martyr) (1504–1528), Scottish Protestant reformer and son of the above
Patrick Hamilton (poet) (1575–1658), Church of Scotland minister and poet
Patrick Hamilton (writer) (1904–1962), novelist and playwright
Patrick Omolade Hamilton, Sierra Leone judge